Ann Eleanor Stephens ( Mackenzie; 28 March 1933 – 17 December 2022) was a New Zealand squash player and badminton player. In 2011, she was inducted into the New Zealand Squash Hall of Fame.

Stephens died on 17 December 2022, at the age of 89.

Awards
 (1956, 1957, 1958, 1960, 1961, 1963)

References

1933 births
2022 deaths
New Zealand female squash players
New Zealand female badminton players